Deepa Shankar is an Indian actress who has worked predominantly in the Tamil movie industry. Deepa has worked in movies like Maayandi Kudumbathar (2009), Kadaikutty Singam (2018) and Doctor (2021). She made her debut in popular television show Metti Oli.  She participated in the reality television show Cooku with Comali.

Early life and career 
She moved on from Thoothukudi to Coimbatore for her higher education at Kumaraguru College of Arts and Science. She auditioned for Metti Oli in which she was selected for a supporting role, which was her first on-screen role. After working in television, she was noticed for her role in Doctor (2021) for which one critic wrote that she had "imppecable comic timing". Another critic opined that "Then, there is Deepa Shankar, who gets some of the film’s funniest lines, and is great with physical comedy".

Filmography

Films

Reality Shows

Serials

Music videos
"Oosingo" (2021)

Awards and nominations

References

External links 

Living people
Actresses in Tamil cinema
Actresses in Tamil television
Year of birth missing (living people)